This is a list of mayors of Zrenjanin since 1872.

The Mayor of Zrenjanin is the head of the City of Zrenjanin (the sixth largest city in Serbia and third largest city in the Autonomous Province of Vojvodina). He acts on behalf of the City, and performs an executive function in the City of Zrenjanin. The current Mayor of Zrenjanin is Simo Salapura (SNS).

Austria-Hungary
Mihály Stefulics (1872 – 1874)
Lájos Kulifay (1874 – 1888)
Jovan Krstić (1888 – 1896)
József Grandjean (1896 – 1902)
Zoltán Perišić (1902 – 1918)

Kingdom of Serbs, Croats and Slovenes / Kingdom of Yugoslavia
Jovan Miljković (1918 – 1919)
Ivan Mirkov (1919)
Živan Jankahidac (1919 – 1920)
Đurica Berberski (1920 – 1921)
Bogoljub Aleksić (1921 – 1924)
Đurica Berberski (1924)
Bogoljub Aleksić (1924 – 1928)
Jovan Stajić (1928)
Nikola Stefanović (1929 – 1931)
Miloš Stefanović (1931 – 1935)
Đurica Berberski (1935)
Milorad Vladiv (1935 – 1936)
Vladimir Živković (1936 – 1939)
Milorad Cvetkov (1939 – 1940)
Pera Erdeljanov (1940 – 1941)

Nazi German occupation
Josef Gion (1941 – 1944)

DF Yugoslavia / FPR Yugoslavia / SFR Yugoslavia
Đorđe Marinković (1944)
Svetozar Ružić (1944 – 1945)
Slavko Kirćanski (1945 – 1948)
Vladeta Savić (1948 – 1949)
Dragoljub Kirćanski (1949 – 1950)
Svetislav Ješić (1950 – 1955)
Dragoljub Kirćanski (1955 – 1959)
Milorad Birovljev (1959 – 1962)
Vojin Arsenov (1962 – 1967)
Ljubomir Pajić (1967 – 1970)
Dušan Radaković (1971 – 1974)
Mirko Čelar (1974 – 1979)
Miroljub Gećin (1979 – 1982)
Milorad Milisavljević (1982 – 1983)
Milan Bubreško (1983 – 1984)
Milan Vujin (1984 – 1985)
Bogdana Glumac-Levakov (1985 – 1986)
Borislav Odadžić (1986 – 1987)
Milan Milošev (1988)
Đorđe Mavrenski (1989)

FR Yugoslavia / Serbia and Montenegro

Republic of Serbia

See also
 Zrenjanin

References

External links
 Web Page of the City of Zrenjanin
 Списак градоначелника Великог Бечкерека, Петровграда и Зрењанина 

Zrenjanin
Zrenjanin